Miccolamia cleroides is a species of beetle in the family Cerambycidae. It was described by Bates in 1884. It is known from Japan.

References

Desmiphorini
Beetles described in 1884